Carle Foundation Hospital is a 433-bed regional care hospital in Urbana, Illinois, United States, that has achieved Magnet designation. It is owned by the not-for-profit (NFPO) Carle Foundation, which also consists of Carle Physician Group and Health Alliance Medical Plans. It is the region's only level 1 trauma center.

The Carle system also includes Carle BroMenn Medical Center, Carle Eureka Hospital, Carle Hoopeston Regional Health Center and Carle Richland Memorial Hospital.

Carle is a vertically integrated system led by James Leonard, President and CEO since 2000. He has served Carle since the early 1980s. The hospital is the primary teaching hospital for the Carle-Illinois College of Medicine, the medical school at the University of Illinois at Urbana-Champaign.

History
The history of these entities began in 1918 when Margaret Burt Carle Morris left $40,000 to the City of Urbana, Illinois for the purpose of starting a hospital. Her donation led to the creation of The Urbana Memorial Hospital Association.

In 1931, J.C. Thomas Rogers and Hugh L. Davison, two physicians from the Mayo Clinic in Rochester, Minnesota, moved to Urbana and opened what was then called Carle Memorial Hospital and the Rogers-Davison Clinic. Housed in the abandoned Eastern Illinois Medical Sanitarium, the Clinic and 15-bed Hospital introduced the concept of multi-specialty group practice to the area.

Though the Clinic and Hospital were separated into two distinct organizations in 1946, they were reunited on April 1, 2010.

The 433-bed regional care hospital has achieved Magnet designation, the United States' highest honor for nursing care. It offers a more advanced level of clinical expertise and technology than any other area hospital, housing the area's only level I trauma center as well as level III perinatal services. The hospital admitted more than 20,500 patients and treated more than 63,300 patients in the emergency room during 2009.

In 2020, the Carle system bought BroMenn Medical Center in Normal, Illinois and Eureka Hospital in Eureka, Illinois from Advocate Aurora Health.

Notable accreditations

DNV GL Full Accreditation
DNV GL Comprehensive Stroke Center Certification
Designation as a Level I Trauma Center and a Level III Center for Perinatal Care by the Illinois Department of Public Health
Magnet Status for excellence in nursing care for Carle Foundation Hospital and Carle Physician Group
ISO 9001:2008 Certification
Designation as an Emergent Stroke Ready Hospital by the Illinois Department of Public Health (Carle Hoopeston Regional Health Center)
Accreditation as a Chest Pain Center by the Society of Cardiovascular Patient Care
Designation as a Lung Screening Center by the American College of Radiology
Bariatric Surgery Center of Excellence by the American Society for Metabolic and Bariatric Surgery (ASMBS)
Full accreditation for Inpatient Rehab, including Stroke Specialty, by the Commission on Accreditation of Rehabilitation Facilities (CARF); Brain *Injury Specialty Certification
Certificate of Accreditation with commendations for the Carle Cancer Registry from the Commission on Cancer; Community Hospital Comprehensive Cancer Program through 2017
Emergency Department Approved for Pediatrics (EDAP)
Sponsoring institution for an ACGME Accredited General Surgery Residency Program
ACE™ Accredited for cardiac catheterization and percutaneous coronary intervention
Designation as a Level 3 Epilepsy Center by the National Association of Epilepsy Centers (NAEC)

References

External links
 
 

1931 establishments in Illinois
Buildings and structures in Urbana, Illinois
Hospitals established in 1931
Hospitals in Illinois